Tyspanodes metachrysialis is a moth in the family Crambidae. It was described by Oswald Bertram Lower in 1903. It is found in Australia, where it has been recorded from Queensland.

References

Moths described in 1903
Spilomelinae